Eloops is a SaaS-based employee engagement platform headquartered in Tel Aviv, Israel. It was established in 2017.

History 
Idan Shem Tov, Sharon Dayag, Tal Groder, and Naor Melamed co-founded Eloops in 2017. They are the chief executive officer, chief operating officer, chief marketing officer, and chief technology officer respectively. Previously, Eloops was known as Eventloops, which was founded in 2017 as a private social network for events. It is headquartered in Tel Aviv, Israel and has a base in Santa Monica, California, United States. Venture capitals Fusion LA and Sarona Ventures backed Eloops.

In September 2020, Eloops integrated with Microsoft Teams to allow employees already using the platform to engage with Eloops without an additional installation.

Product 

Eloops is a SaaS-based employee engagement platform that collaborates with human resource leaders across various industries, enabling the leaders to connect with their company workforce through engaging content such as peer-to-peer recognition programs, competitions, challenges, and trivia quizzes that align with their company values, culture, and goals. The activities are rewarded with virtual company coins, redeemable against online and offline options such as store discounts, gift cards, company-branded merchandise, and other perks and experiences such as free parking and lunch with higher leadership. 

The technology of the platform generates various data points such as top engaged employees, preferred activities, interaction frequencies, and content with the highest engagement. The data insights help the company to adopt new approaches or adapt existing ones to build a holistic company culture and employee experience. It has a marketplace of customizable content templates, apps and integrations that combine with the technological tools to help human resource managers with workforce engagement.

References 

2017 establishments in Israel
Human resource management
Companies based in Tel Aviv